Strength athletics in Iceland refers to the participation of Icelandic competitors and the holding of Icelandic events in the modern phenomenon of strength athletics inaugurated by the World's Strongest Man. The sport's roots have a long history going back many centuries before the televisation of strongman competitions in the 1970s and Iceland has a role in that more ancient heritage. In terms of modern strength athletics, Iceland has held a preeminent position as a nation due to the enormous success of its competitors on the international stage, who between them have won Nine World's Strongest Man titles, and numerous major European and international competitions.

History
The origin of Icelanders testing each other through feats and tests of strength predates the introduction of strength athletics and in terms of strength based sports there had been a number of noted powerlifters and weightlifters during the twentieth century. However, in the era of strongman competition Iceland has a record that belies the size of the nation's population having won 9 World's Strongest Man titles, second only to the USA who have won 12 titles. Before Iceland had its own national competition, it already had men competing on the international circuit. In 1983, the young powerlifter and bodybuilder, Jón Páll Sigmarsson entered the 1983 World's Strongest Man competition and was only beaten into second place by the experienced Geoff Capes. Sigmarsson went on to win the competition the following year and in total won the World's Strongest Man four times, and became the first man to win the title 4 times. Sigmarsson was also a six times World Muscle Power champion, 2 times Europe's Strongest Man and winner of the Pure Strength title. His contemporary, and good friend Hjalti Árnason, was also competing at this time and as well as podium finishes in World Muscle Power and World Strongman Challenge, he won the highly regarded Le Defi Mark Ten International competition. Magnús Ver Magnússon followed in their footsteps and emulated Sigmarsson's four World's Strongest Man titles, becoming the second man to win the title 4 times. He also won World Strongman Challenge, Europe's Strongest Man and European Hercules competitions. Ver Magnússon and Árnason also won the 1989 Pure Strength team competition. There have also been a number of other highly respected Icelandic competitors in the top international events including Benedikt Magnússon, Torfi Ólafsson and most notably Stefán Sölvi Pétursson who achieved fourth-place in the 2010 World's Strongest Man competition. The next entire decade of Icelandic Strongman competitions was dominated by Hafþór Júlíus Björnsson who won the main National title 10 consecutive times in addition to winning several other national competitions multiple times and also winning 9 Giants Live tours including the Europe's Strongest Man 5 times, 8 Strongman Champions League titles, the Arnold Strongman Classic 3 consecutive times, the World's Strongest Man and the World's Ultimate Strongman becoming the most decorated Icelandic Strongman of All time.

National competitions
Since 1985, Iceland has had its own national competition, Iceland's Strongest Man. There have also been three other major titles contested in Iceland, including Strongest Man in Iceland, Iceland's Strongest Man (IFSA) and Iceland's Strongest Viking.

Iceland’s Strongest Man
In 1985, the very first Iceland's Strongest Man contest was staged. Hjalti Árnason was second to Jón Páll that year whilst Magnús Ver Magnússon came third. Thus, in the very first contest the podium finishers would between them go on to win the World's Strongest Man eight times, the World Muscle Power Classic seven times, the World Strongman Challenge, Le Defi Mark Ten International and numerous powerlifting titles including the super-heavyweight IPF World Powerlifting Championships. The contest's profile was immediately internationally renowned and it eventually became an open competition, although if a non-Icelander wins, the title of Iceland's Strongest Man defers to the highest place Icelander. This has only happened on 2 occasions when the legendary Bill Kazmaier of the United States and Regin Vagadal of the Faroe Islands won. Tom Stoltman, Terry Hollands and Adrian Rollinson of the United Kingdom and Don Pope of the USA have all placed second. Luke Stoltman of the United Kingdom has placed third.

Champions breakdown

Most podium finishes without winning the title

Strongest Man in Iceland

Iceland's Strongest Man (IFSA)
The IFSA organised the Iceland's Strongest Man competition for a number of years before 2005. However, when the IFSA disassociated from the World's Strongest Man competition, Iceland's Strongest Man remained the official qualifier with no IFSA involvement. The IFSA did continue to promote their own version until their financial demise at the end of 2008.

Results courtesy of David Horne's World of Grip

Iceland's Strongest Viking
In 2010, this contest was held for the nineteenth time, dating it back to 1992. In some years the results of this contest have been combined with those of Iceland's Strongest Man in order to ascertain who qualifies for the World's Strongest Man.

Regional Competitions

Nordic Strongman Championships
The Nordic Strongman Championships consists of athletes from Iceland, Norway, Sweden, Finland and Denmark.

See also
Strength athletics

References

Strongmen competitions
Iceland